Opera Delaware is a professional opera company located in Wilmington, Delaware. The company was founded in 1944 and is one of the oldest professional opera companies in the United States. To date the company has staged 198 productions of 104 operas by 55 composers. Opera Delaware has also presented 19 world premieres (18% of their repertoire) and three U.S. premieres.  The company has recently undergone a transition to a festival season in May and has frequently received positive reviews for its productions in such publications as Opera News and the New York Times.
Opera News writes, "Opera Delaware continues to provide quality productions that both entertain and involve the community it serves... superbly produced and led by an all around stellar cast." The company performs its productions at the historic Grand Opera House.

See also
 Music of Delaware

References

External links
 OperaDelaware website
 Grand Opera House website
 Delaware Division of the Arts website

Delaware
Wilmington, Delaware
Musical groups established in 1944
Wilmington Riverfront
1944 establishments in Delaware
Musical groups from Delaware
Performing arts in Delaware